Events from the year 1751 in Scotland.

Incumbents

Law officers 
 Lord Advocate – William Grant of Prestongrange
 Solicitor General for Scotland – Patrick Haldane of Gleneagles, jointly with Alexander Hume

Judiciary 
 Lord President of the Court of Session – Lord Arniston the Elder
 Lord Justice General – Lord Ilay
 Lord Justice Clerk – Lord Tinwald

Events 
 24 April – John Wesley arrives at Musselburgh, his destination on his first mission to Scotland.
 21 June – Alexander Geddes from Kinnermony, Banffshire, is executed at Aberdeen for bestiality, becoming the last felon in Scotland to be burnt following execution.
 1 July – The Cameronians, at this time serving in Ireland, are formally ranked as the 26th Regiment of Foot.
 David Hume settles in Edinburgh and publishes An Enquiry Concerning the Principles of Morals.
 In the University of Glasgow:
 Adam Smith is appointed professor of logic.
 The Medical School is founded.
 John Smith & Son bookshop in Glasgow established, claiming to be the oldest surviving bookseller in the English-speaking world.
 Culter paper mill established.
 First turnpike act for Scotland, for improvement of the road from Edinburgh to South Queensferry.
 Approximate date – bridge built at Bridge of Orchy.

Births 
 23 April – Gilbert Elliot-Murray-Kynynmound, colonial administrator (died 1814 in England)
 3 or 29 June – William Roxburgh, surgeon and botanist, "father of Indian botany" (died 1815)
 2 August – William Adam of Blair Adam, judge and politician (died 1839)
 8 August – William Leslie, British Army officer (killed 1777 at Battle of Princeton)
 10 December – James Donaldson, printer, newspaper publisher and philanthropist (died 1830) 
 Donald Campbell, traveler in India and the Middle East (died 1804 in England)
 Approximate date – Helen Craik, novelist and poet (died 1825 in England)

Deaths 
 16 February – Charles Maitland, politician (born c. 1704)
 18 February – Patrick Campbell, politician (born 1684)
 24 May – William Hamilton, comic poet (born c. 1665)
 22 August (2 September NS) – Andrew Gordon, Benedictine and inventor (born 1712; died in Saxony)
 September – David Fordyce, philosopher (born 1711; lost at sea)

The arts
 Alasdair mac Mhaighstir Alasdair publishes his anti-Hanoverian volume of poems Ais-Eiridh na Sean Chánoin Albannaich ("The Resurrection of the Ancient Scottish Language") in Edinburgh, including his satire on the aisling form An Airce ("The Ark").
 Tobias Smollett's novel The Adventures of Peregrine Pickle is published.
Robert Louis Stevenson's book "Kidnapped" is based in 1751.

See also 

 Timeline of Scottish history

References 

 
Years of the 18th century in Scotland
Scotland
1750s in Scotland